Marty Morell (born February 25, 1944) is a jazz drummer who was a member of the Bill Evans Trio for seven years—longer than any other drummer. Before joining Evans, he worked with the Al Cohn-Zoot Sims Quintet, Red Allen, Gary McFarland, Steve Kuhn, and Gábor Szabó.

Career
From 1968 to 1974, he was in a trio with pianist Bill Evans and bassist Eddie Gómez. Peter Pettinger, a biographer of Evans, called Morell "an unsung stalwart of piano trio history":

After leaving the trio, he settled in Toronto, Canada, and became a studio drummer. He led bands as a drummer and played vibraphone and congas with the 1970s funk-jazz band Ravin'. He has played on jingles and films and has worked with Don Sebesky, Stan Getz, Kenny Wheeler, Claus Ogerman,  From 1968 to 1971, he was a member of Rob McConnell's Boss Brass.

He has taught drums and percussion at the University of Central Florida and has recorded with The Jazz Professors, a band consisting of university faculty members: saxophonist Jeff Rupert, bassist Richard Drexler, pianist Per Danielsson, trombonist Michael Wilkinson, and guitarist Bobby Koelble. The band has had two albums on the top of the chart at Jazzweek magazine in 2011 and 2013.

Discography
With Canadian Brass
 Red, White & Brass (1991)
 Red Hot Jazz (1993)
 Seen and Heard (2004)

With Bill Evans
 What's New (Verve, 1969) 
 The Secret Sessions Recorded at the Village Vanguard, discs 7 and 8 (Milestone Records, 1969 and 1973, respectively)
 Autumn Leaves (Lotus, 1969) 
 Jazzhouse (Milestone, 1969) 
 You're Gonna Hear from Me (Milestone, 1969) 
 Quiet Now (Charly, 1969) 
 From Left to Right (MGM, 1970) 
 Montreux II (CTI, 1970) 
 The Bill Evans Album (Columbia, 1971) 
 Living Time (Columbia, 1972) 
 The Tokyo Concert (Fantasy, 1973)
 Half Moon (Milestone, 1973)
 Since We Met (Fantasy, 1974) 
 Re: Person I Knew (Fantasy, 1974) 
 Symbiosis (MPS, 1974) 
 But Beautiful (Milestone, 1974) 
 Blue in Green: The Concert in Canada (Milestone, 1974)
 Bill Evans Trio in Buenos Aires, Vol. 1: 1973 Concert (1991)
 Paris (1965) (1992)
 Live in Tokyo (1994)
 The Secret Sessions (1996)
 Half Moon Bay (1998)
 Piano Player (1998)
 Koln Concert 1976 (2005)
 Live in Rome 1979 (2005)
 Waltz for Debby: The Complete 1969 Pescara Festival (2005)
 Complete February 1972 Paris ORTF Performance (2006)
 Evolution of a Trio (2006)
 Live in Ottawa 1974 (2007)
 In Helsinki 1970 (2009)
 Live in Paris 1974 (2009)
 Live at Art D'Lugoff's Top of the Gate (2012)
 Momentum (2012)

With The Jazz Professors
 The Jazz Professors: Live at the UCF-Orlando Jazz Festival (Flying Horse, 2012)
 Do That Again (Flying Horse, 2013)

With Rob McConnell & the Boss Brass
 Big Band Jazz (1978)
 Present Perfect (1981)
 Live in Digital (1992)

With Gábor Szabó
 The Sorcerer (Impulse!, 1967)
 More Sorcery (Impulse!, 1967)

With Kenny Wheeler
 Ensemble Fusionaire (CBC, 1976)
 1976  (1976)

With others
 The October Suite Steve Kuhn/Gary McFarland (1966)
 The College Concert, Pee Wee Russell and Red Allen (Impulse!, 1966)
 Monium, Jeremy Steig (Columbia, 1974)
 New Life, Bernie Senensky (1975)
 Museum Pieces, Moe Koffman (1978)
 Back Again, The Hi-Lo's (1979)
 Night Flight, Sammy Nestico (1986)
 I Remember Bill: Tribute to Bill Evans, Don Sebesky (1998)
 Magic Voices, The Singers Unlimited (1998)
 A Man and His Music, Claus Ogerman (2004)
 Sketch for Summer, Gary McFarland (2008)
 Coral Sea, Kenny Drew Jr.  (Random Act, 2012)

References

External links
Marty Morell NAMM (National Association of Music Merchants) Oral History Interview, November 10, 2006

American jazz musicians
Living people
1944 births
Juilliard School alumni